The Haran Gawaita (Mandaic ࡄࡀࡓࡀࡍ ࡂࡀࡅࡀࡉࡕࡀ "Inner Harran" or "Inner Hauran") also known as the Scroll of Great Revelation, is a Mandaean text which recounts the history of the Mandaeans and their arrival in Media as Nasoraeans from Jerusalem.

Text, dating and authorship
The text is in the Mandaic language and script, and is dated to around the 4th6th centuries. It is of unknown authorship.

Content
According to the Haran Gawaita, John the Baptist was baptized, initiated, and educated by the patron of the Nasirutha (secret knowledge), Enosh (Anush or Anush-ʼuthra), the hierophant of the sect. This research was conducted by the Oxford scholar and specialist on the Nasoraeans, Lady Ethel S. Drower. According to Jorunn J. Buckley, the Mandaeans see themselves to be former Judeans based in Jerusalem that loved Adonai until the birth of Jesus. These Nasoraean disciples of John the Baptist are aware of the destruction of Jerusalem and the Temple in 70 CE, but they did not leave because of this. They fled before 70 CE due to persecution by a faction of more normative or Orthodox Jews. With the help of the Parthian king Artabanus II (Ardban II; previously known as Ardban III), who ruled from 11-38 CE, the Mandaeans settled in the Median Hills (Mandaic: Ṭura ḏ-Madai), and later moved to southern Babylonia.

Manuscripts and translations
An English translation of the Haran Gawaita and the Diwan Masbuta d Hibil Ziwa was published in 1953 by Lady E. S. Drower, which was based on manuscripts 9 and 36 of the Drower Collection (abbreviated DC 9 and DC 36, respectively).

A German translation, which makes use of Drower's manuscripts as well as two additional privately held manuscripts, was published in 2020 by Bogdan Burtea.

Buckley has also located a privately held copy of the Haran Gawaita dating from 1930 in Flushing, New York.

See also
 Essenes
 Timeline of Jerusalem
 Second Temple Judaism
 Harran

References

Further reading
 The Haran Gawaita and the Baptism of Hibil-Ziwa: the Mandaic text, E. S. Drower
 The Haran Gawaita and the Baptism of Hibil-Ziwa. The Mandaic Text Reproduced Together with Translation, Notes, and Commentary translated and edited by E. S. Drower  (Mandaic text omitted)
 Diwan Maṣbuta Hibil Ziwa, 1953
 
 Lofts, Mark J. (2013). "When did Zazai d-Gawazta live?" In ARAM 25:2 (2013) 381-399.

External links
Haran Gawaitha (Mandaic text from the Mandaean Network)
Haran Gawaitha (Mandaic text from the Mandaean Network)

Mandaean texts
History books about religion